Yves Allégret (13 October 1905 – 31 January 1987) was a French film director, often working in the film noir genre. He was born in Asnières-sur-Seine, Hauts-de-Seine and died in Paris.

He was an assistant to film directors such as his brother Marc Allégret, Augusto Genina, and Jean Renoir.

Filmography

Feature films
 Tobias Is an Angel (1940)
 The Emigrant (dir. Léo Joannon, 1940)
 Box of Dreams (1945)
 Les démons de l'aube (1946)
 Dédée d'Anvers (1948)
 Une si jolie petite plage (1949)
 Manèges (1950)
 Les Miracles n'ont lieu qu'une fois (1951)
 Leathernose (1952)
 La Jeune Folle (1952)
 The Proud and the Beautiful (1953)
 Oh No, Mam'zelle (1954)
 Oasis (1955)
 The Best Part (1956)
 Méfiez-vous fillettes (1957)
 Send a Woman When the Devil Fails (1957)
 The Daughter of Hamburg (1958)
 The Restless and the Damned (1959)
 Jack of Spades (1960)
 Konga Yo (1962)
 Germinal (1963)
 Johnny Banco (1967)
 L'Invasion (1970)
 Mords pas, on t'aime (1976)

TV series
  (1977)

References

External links
 

1905 births
1987 deaths
People from Asnières-sur-Seine
French film directors